Kwai Fong is one of the 29 constituencies of the Kwai Tsing District, returning one member to the Kwai Tsing District Council every four years. It was first created in 1994, and the seat has been held by Leung Yiu-chung of the Neighbourhood and Worker's Service Centre ever since.

Loosely based on Kwai Fong Estate and the Tai Lin Pai industrial area, the constituency has an estimated population of 18,107 as of 2019.

Councillors represented

Election results

2010s

2000s

1990s

Notes

Citations

References
2011 District Council Election Results (Kwai Tsing)
2007 District Council Election Results (Kwai Tsing)
2003 District Council Election Results (Kwai Tsing)

Constituencies of Hong Kong
Constituencies of Kwai Tsing District Council
1994 establishments in Hong Kong
Constituencies established in 1994